The Most subtitled (The Best of The Cruel Sea) is the first greatest hits by Australian indie rock band The Cruel Sea. The album was released in November 1999 and peaked at number 43 the ARIA Charts. The album was certified gold in 2001.

Track listing

Charts

Certification

Release history

References

1999 compilation albums
The Cruel Sea (band) albums
Compilation albums by Australian artists